Abdul Hai is a Muslim male given name, and in modern usage, surname. It is built from the Arabic words Abd, al- and Hayy. The name means "servant of the Living God", Al-Hayy being one of the names of God in the Qur'an, which give rise to the Muslim theophoric names.

The letter a of the al- is unstressed, and can be transliterated by almost any vowel, often by e. So the first part can appear as Abdel, Abdul or Abd-al. The second part may appear as Hai, Hay, Hayy or in other ways. The whole name is subject to variable spacing and hyphenation. 

Notable people with the name include:

Saʿīd Abdul-Hay ibn Dhaḥḥāk ibn Maḥmūd Gardēzī, or just Abu Saʿīd Gardēzī, (died ca. 1061), Persian historian
Muhammad Abdul-Hayy Siddiqui, known as Bekhud Badayuni (1857-1912), Indian Urdu poet
Saleh Abdel Hai (1896-1962), Egyptian singer
Abdul Hai Habibi (1910-1984), Afghan scholar and historian
Abdel hay Mashhour (born 1923), Egyptian academic administrator
Mohammed Abdul-Hayy (1944-1989), Sudanese poet
Daniel Abdal-Hayy Moore, known as Daniel Moore (poet), (born 1940), American poet, essayist and librettist
Asif Abdulhai Mulla, or just Asif Mulla (born 1980), Indian-Canadian cricketer
Abdul Hai Baloch, Pakistani politician
Abdul Hai Neamati, Afghan politician
Abdul Hai (Delhi cricketer), active 1934–1936
Abdul Hai (Hyderabad cricketer), Hyderabad cricketer
Muhammad Abdul Hye (1919-1969), Bengali litterateur and linguist

References

Arabic masculine given names